Ludhiana South Assembly constituency (Sl. No.: 61) is a Punjab Legislative Assembly constituency in Ludhiana district, Punjab state, India. 
It is part of Ludhiana district.

Members of the Legislative Assembly

Election results

2022

2017

See also
 List of constituencies of the Punjab Legislative Assembly
 Ludhiana district

References

External links
  

Assembly constituencies of Punjab, India
Ludhiana district